Dr. Ferenc Kovács (born 1960) is a Hungarian jurist and politician, member of the National Assembly (MP) for Nyíregyháza (Szabolcs-Szatmár-Bereg County Constituency I) from 2010 to 2014. He is the current Mayor of Nyíregyháza from 3 October 2010.

He was a member of the Constitutional, Judicial and Standing Orders Committee between 14 May 2010 and 7 March 2011; he therefore participated in the drawing up of the new constitution in the spring of 2011. After that he held the position of vice chairman of the Committee of National Cohesion since 1 January 2011.

Personal life
He is married and has three children.

References

1960 births
Living people
Hungarian jurists
Fidesz politicians
Members of the National Assembly of Hungary (2010–2014)
Mayors of places in Hungary
People from Szabolcs-Szatmár-Bereg County